Tykes Water is a minor tributary of the River Colne in Hertfordshire in England.

Its head waters are a  network of drainage ditches west of the A41 near Bushey that feed into  Aldenham reservoir. The outlet  of the reservoir then flows north into the lake in Haberdashers' Aske's School grounds known as Tykes Water Lake. It then proceeds north to  make a confluence with a secondary stream, also called Tykes Water, near Kendal Hall Farm.

The combined Tykes Waters flow through the centre of Radlett parallel to the railway and then flow north to join the River Colne near Colney Street. The lower part is also called   The Brook.

The secondary Tykes Water also known as Borehamwood Brook on some maps rises to the south of Borehamwood near Yavneh College  and runs north through the town  where it has been dammed to produce ornamental lakes in Aberford Park. It then runs north through open country  .

A minor tributary  collects water from farm land north of Borehamwood and also  joins  near  Kendal Hall Farm.

Kitwells Brook joins the main stream just north of Radlett and drains land to the east in the direction of Shenley.

In popular culture 

Tykes Water Bridge in Aldenham Country Park features in the open credits to the Peter Cushing and Christopher Lee film, Dracula A.D. 1972, and is used in several episodes of the Diana Rigg and Linda Thorson seasons of The Avengers .

References 

Rivers of Hertfordshire
Colne catchment